Robert Phillip Leonetti (January 1, 1923 – August 1973) was an American football player who played at the guard position on both offense and defense. He played college football for Wake Forest in 1946 and 1947 and professional football for the Buffalo Bills and Brooklyn Dodgers in 1948.

Early years
Leonetti was born in 1923 in Mount Carmel, Pennsylvania, and attended Mount Carmel High School.

College football and military service
Leonetti began playing college football as a tackle at George Washington University. served in the Army during World War II. After the war, he played college football for Wake Forest during its 1946 and 1947 seasons.

Professional football
He was selected by the Philadelphia Eagles in the ninth round (71st overall pick) of the 1947 NFL Draft but did not play for the Eagles. He played professional football in the All-America Football Conference (AAFC) for the Buffalo Bills and Brooklyn Dodgers during their 1948 seasons. He appeared in two games for Buffalo before being traded to Brooklyn where he appeared in either seven or nine games.

Later years
He died in 1973 at age 50.

References

1923 births
1973 deaths
Brooklyn Dodgers (AAFC) players
Wake Forest Demon Deacons football players
Players of American football from Pennsylvania
People from Mount Carmel, Pennsylvania
United States Army personnel of World War II